The filmography of Steven Soderbergh catalogues the filmmaking of American director, producer, and screenwriter, Steven Soderbergh. He has directed 29 feature films and eight television programs. His directorial works have grossed over US$2.2 billion worldwide.

Film

Executive producer

Producer

Television

Executive producer only
 Unscripted (2005)
 Red Oaks (2014–2017)
 The Girlfriend Experience (2016–present)
 Godless (2017)
 Wireless (2020)

Audio commentaries 

On his own films
Sex, Lies, and Videotape, with filmmaker Neil LaBute
Schizopolis
Out of Sight, with screenwriter Scott Frank
The Limey, with screenwriter Lem Dobbs
Traffic, with screenwriter Stephen Gaghan
Ocean's Eleven, with screenwriter Ted Griffin
Full Frontal, with screenwriter Coleman Hough
Solaris, with producer James Cameron
Ocean's Twelve, with screenwriter George Nolfi (Blu-ray only)
Bubble, with filmmaker Mark Romanek
Ocean's Thirteen, with screenwriters Brian Koppelman and David Levien (Blu-ray only)
The Girlfriend Experience, with actress Sasha Grey
The Informant!, with screenwriter Scott Z. Burns (Blu-ray only)

On other films
Apartment Zero, with screenwriter/producer David Koepp
Billy Budd, with actor Terence Stamp
Catch-22, with director Mike Nichols
Clean, Shaven, with director Lodge Kerrigan
The Daytrippers, with director Greg Mottola and editor Anne McCabe
The Graduate, with director Mike Nichols
Point Blank, with director John Boorman
Seabiscuit, with director Gary Ross
Suture, with directors Scott McGehee and David Siegel
The Third Man, with screenwriter Tony Gilroy
Who's Afraid of Virginia Woolf?, with director Mike Nichols
The Yards, with director James Gray

Notes

References 

Soderbergh, Steven